"By Now" is a song written by Dean Dillon, Don Pfrimmer and Charles Quillen, and recorded by American country music artist Steve Wariner.  It was released in April 1981 as the second single from the album Steve Wariner.  The song reached number 6 on the Billboard Hot Country Singles & Tracks chart.

Chart performance

References

1981 singles
Steve Wariner songs
Songs written by Dean Dillon
Songs written by Don Pfrimmer
Songs written by Charles Quillen
Song recordings produced by Tom Collins (record producer)
RCA Records singles
1981 songs